Sir Joseph Paxton (3 August 1803 – 8 June 1865) was an English gardener, architect, engineer and Member of Parliament, best known for designing the Crystal Palace and for cultivating the Cavendish banana, the most consumed banana in the Western world.

Early life

Paxton was born in 1803, the seventh son of a farming family, in Milton Bryan, Bedfordshire. Some references, incorrectly, list his birth year as 1801. This is, as he admitted in later life, a result of misinformation he provided in his teens, which enabled him to enrol at Chiswick Gardens. He became a garden boy at the age of fifteen for Sir Gregory Osborne Page-Turner at Battlesden Park, near Woburn. After several moves, he obtained a position in 1823 at the Horticultural Society's Chiswick Gardens.

Chatsworth

The Horticultural Society's gardens were close to the gardens of William Cavendish, 6th Duke of Devonshire, at Chiswick House. The duke met the young gardener as he strolled in his gardens and became impressed with his skill and enthusiasm. He offered the 20-year-old Paxton the position of head gardener at Chatsworth, which was considered one of the finest landscaped gardens of the time.

Although the duke was in Russia, Paxton set off for Chatsworth on the Chesterfield coach arriving at Chatsworth at half past four in the morning. By his own account he had explored the gardens after scaling the kitchen garden wall, set the staff to work, eaten breakfast with the housekeeper and met his future wife, Sarah Bown, the housekeeper's niece, completing his first morning's work before nine o'clock. He married Bown in 1827, and she proved capable of managing his affairs, leaving him free to pursue his ideas.

He enjoyed a friendly relationship with his employer who recognised his diverse talents and facilitated his rise to prominence.

One of Paxton's first projects was to redesign the garden around the new north wing of the house and expand Chatsworth's collection of conifers into a  arboretum which still exists. He became skilled at moving mature trees. The largest, weighing about eight tons, was moved from Kedleston Road in Derby. Among several other large projects at Chatsworth were the rock garden, the Emperor Fountain, and rebuilding Edensor village.

Greenhouses

In 1832, Paxton developed an interest in greenhouses at Chatsworth where he designed a series of buildings with "forcing frames" for espalier trees and for the cultivation of exotic plants such as highly prized pineapples. At the time the use of glass houses was in its infancy and those at Chatsworth were dilapidated. After experimentation, he designed a glass house with a ridge and furrow roof that would be at right angles to the morning and evening sun and an ingenious frame design that would admit maximum light: the forerunner of the modern greenhouse.

The next great building at Chatsworth was built for the first seeds of the Victoria regia lily which had been sent to Kew from the Amazon in 1836. Although they had germinated and grown they had not flowered and in 1849 a seedling was given to Paxton to try out at Chatsworth. It continued growing and it became necessary to build a much larger house, the Victoria Regia House. Inspired by the waterlily's huge leaves – 'a natural feat of engineering' –  he found the structure for his conservatory which he tested by floating his daughter Annie on a leaf. The secret was in the rigidity provided by the radiating ribs connecting with flexible cross-ribs. Constant experimentation over a number of years led him to devise the glasshouse design that inspired the Crystal Palace.

With a cheap and light wooden frame, the conservatory design had a ridge-and-furrow roof to let in more light and drained rainwater away. He used hollow pillars doubling as drain pipes and designed a special rafter that acted as an internal and external gutter. All the elements were pre-fabricated and, like modular buildings, could be produced in vast numbers and assembled into buildings of varied design.

The columns and beams were made of cast iron, and the arched elements of laminated wood. At the time, the conservatory was the largest glass building in the world. Chance produced  sheets for Paxton's benefit. The structure was heated by eight boilers using  of iron pipe and cost more than £30,000. It had a central carriageway and when the Queen was driven through, it was lit with twelve thousand lamps. It was prohibitively expensive to maintain, and was not heated during the First World War. The plants died and it was demolished in the 1920s.

Crystal Palace

The Great Conservatory was the test-bed for the prefabricated glass and iron structural techniques which Paxton pioneered and would employ for his masterpiece: The Crystal Palace of the Great Exhibition of 1851. These techniques were made physically possible by recent technological advances in the manufacture of both glass and cast iron, and financially possible by the dropping of a tax on glass.

In 1850 the Royal Commission appointed to organise the Great Exhibition were in a quandary. An international competition to design a building to house the Exhibition had produced 245 designs, of which only two were remotely suitable, and all would take too long to build and would be too permanent. There was an outcry by the public and in Parliament against the desecration of Hyde Park.

Paxton was visiting London in his capacity as a director of the Midland Railway to meet the chairman John Ellis who was also a member of parliament. He happened to mention an idea he had for the hall, and Ellis promptly encouraged to produce some plans, provided they could be ready in nine days. Unfortunately he was committed for the next few days, but at a board meeting of the railway in Derby, it is said he appeared to be spending much of his time doodling on a sheet of blotting paper. At the end of the meeting he held up his first sketch of the Crystal Palace, inspired by the Victoria Regia House. The sketch is now in the Victoria and Albert Museum.

He completed the plans and presented them to the Commission, but there was opposition from some members, since another design was well into its planning stage. Paxton decided to by-pass the Commission and published the design in the Illustrated London News to universal acclaim.

Its novelty was its revolutionary modular, prefabricated design, and use of glass. Glazing was carried out from special trolleys, and was fast: one man managed to fix 108 panes in a single day. It required 4,500 tons of iron,  of timber and needed over 293,000 panes of glass. Yet it took 2,000 men just eight months to build, and cost just £79,800. Quite unlike any other building, it was itself a demonstration of British technology in iron and glass. In its construction, Paxton was assisted by Charles Fox, also of Derby for the iron framework, and William Cubitt, Chairman of the Building Committee. All three were knighted. After the exhibition they were employed by the Crystal Palace Company to move it to Sydenham where it remained until it was destroyed by fire in 1936.

Publishing

In 1831, Paxton published a monthly magazine, The Horticultural Register. This was followed by the Magazine of Botany in 1834, the Pocket Botanical Dictionary in 1840, Paxton's Flower Garden (vols. I & II) in 1850 and the Calendar of Gardening Operations. In addition to these titles he also, in 1841, co-founded perhaps the most famous horticultural periodical, The Gardeners' Chronicle along with John Lindley, Charles Wentworth Dilke and William Bradbury and later became its editor.

List of selected publications

Political career

Paxton was a Liberal Member of Parliament for Coventry from 1854 until his death in 1865.

In June 1855 he presented a scheme he called the Great Victorian Way to the Parliamentary Select Committee on Metropolitan Communications in which he envisaged the construction of an arcade, based on the structure of the Crystal Palace, in a ten-mile loop around the centre of London. It would have incorporated a roadway, an atmospheric railway, housing and shops.

Later life

Although he remained the Head Gardener at Chatsworth until 1858, he was also able to undertake outside work such as the Crystal Palace and his directorship of the Midland Railway. He worked on public parks in Liverpool, Birkenhead, Glasgow, Halifax (the People's Park) and the grounds of the Spa Buildings at Scarborough. In October 1845 he was invited to lay out one of the country's first municipal burial grounds in Coventry. This became the London Road Cemetery, where a memorial to Paxton by Joseph Goddard was erected in 1868.

Between 1835 and 1839, he organised plant-hunting expeditions one of which ended in tragedy when two gardeners from Chatsworth sent to California drowned. Tragedy also struck at home when his eldest son died.

In 1850, Paxton was commissioned by Baron Mayer de Rothschild to design Mentmore Towers in Buckinghamshire. This was to be one of the greatest country houses built during the Victorian Era. Following the completion of Mentmore, Baron James de Rothschild, one of Baron de Rothschild's French cousins, commissioned Château de Ferrières at Ferrières-en-Brie near Paris to be "Another Mentmore, but twice the size". Both buildings still stand today.

Paxton also designed another country house, a smaller version of Mentmore at Battlesden near Woburn in Bedfordshire. This house was bought by the Duke of Bedford thirty years after its completion, and demolished, because the Duke wanted no other mansion close to Woburn Abbey.

In 1860, he also designed Fairlawn  89 Wimbledon Southside for Sir Edwin Saunders, Queen Victoria's dentist.

Paxton was honoured by being a member of the Kew Commission which was to suggest improvements for Royal Botanic Gardens, and by being considered for the post of Head Gardener at Windsor Castle.

On 17 March 1860, during the enthusiasm for the Volunteer movement, Paxton raised and commanded the 11th (Matlock) Derbyshire Rifle Volunteer Corps.

He became affluent, not so much through his Chatsworth employment, but by successful speculation in the railway industry. He retired from Chatsworth when the Duke died in 1858 but carried on working at various projects such as the Thames Graving Dock. Paxton died at his home at Rockhills, Sydenham, in 1865 and was buried on the Chatsworth Estate in St Peter's Churchyard, Edensor. His wife Sarah remained at their house on the Chatsworth Estate until her death in 1871.

Notes

References
 
 Cooper, B., (1983) Transformation of a Valley: The Derbyshire Derwent Heinemann, republished 1991 Cromford: Scarthin Books

Further reading
 Kate Colquhoun – A Thing in Disguise: The Visionary Life of Joseph Paxton (Fourth Estate, 2003) 
 George F Chadwick – Works of Sir Joseph Paxton (Architectural Press, 1961)

External links

 
 
 
 John Kenworthy-Browne, Paxton, Sir Joseph, in: Oxford Dictionary of National Biography, 2004 (subscription or British public library reader's card required)
 
 Joseph Paxton's Crystal Palace on ArchDaily
 Joseph Paxton Joseph Paxton's work on orchids
 BBC Historic Figures
 Joseph Paxton – a biography from the landscape architecture and gardens guide
 Joseph Paxton his early work – London Road Cemetery Coventry
 Eddie Richardson's page on Sir Joseph Paxton – includes photographs and a family tree

1803 births
1865 deaths
People from Central Bedfordshire District
19th-century English architects
English landscape architects
English gardeners
Liberal Party (UK) MPs for English constituencies
UK MPs 1852–1857
UK MPs 1857–1859
UK MPs 1859–1865
Knights Bachelor
Members of Parliament for Coventry
Architects from Bedfordshire